AT-rich interactive domain-containing protein 3A is a protein that in humans is encoded by the ARID3A gene.

Function 

This gene encodes a member of the ARID (AT-rich interaction domain) family of DNA binding proteins. It was found by homology to the Drosophila dead ringer gene, which is important for normal embryogenesis. Other ARID family members have roles in embryonic patterning, cell lineage gene regulation, cell cycle control, transcriptional regulation, and possibly in chromatin structure modification.

Interactions 
ARID3A has been shown to interact with:
 BTK, and
 E2F1

References

Further reading

External links 
 
 

Transcription factors